The 2022 Orienteering World Cup is the 27th edition of the Orienteering World Cup. The 2022 Orienteering World Cup consists of six individual events and four relay events. The events are located in Sweden, Estonia, and Switzerland. The 2022 World Orienteering Championships in Denmark are not included in the World Cup. But the European Orienteering Championships in Estonia are part of the world cup, and non-European Orienteers can hence participate in the European Championships as well. By winning the fifth race, middle distance in Davos, Tove Alexandersson secured her eight total world cup win.  Later the same day, Kasper Fosser secured his second total world cup win.

Events

Men

Women

Relay

Points distribution
The 40 best runners in each event are awarded points. The winner is awarded 100 points. In WC events 1 to 7, the six best results count in the overall classification. In the finals (WC 8 and WC 9), both results count.

Overall standings
This section shows the  overall standings after all events.

Men

Women

Team
The table shows the  standings after all events. This was the first year when individual results counted towards the team world cup, meaning competitors contributed to the team's score in both relay and individual events.

References

External links
 World Cup Ranking – IOF

Orienteering World Cup seasons
Orienteering competitions
2022 in orienteering